Members of 5 Platoon, B Company, 7th Battalion, The Royal Australian Regiment, 26 August 1967 is a 1967 photograph by Australian military photographer Mike Coleridge. The photograph, taken near the village of Phước Hải in the-then Phước Tuy Province of South Vietnam, depicts a group of Australian Army soldiers waiting to board an Bell UH-1 Iroquois about to land.

The photograph has become an enduring icon of Australia's involvement in the Vietnam War. Recognising this, the photograph was selected to be etched on the Vietnam Forces National Memorial on Anzac Parade in Canberra.

Circumstances

Operation Ulmarra was a cordon and search operation of Phước Hải, a coastal township in the-then Phouc Toy province of South Vietnam.

The photograph features Private Peter Capp (kneeling), Private Bob Fennell (leaning over, facing camera, with an ammunition belt for an M60 machine gun slung over his shoulder), Corporal Bob D'Arcy (partly obscured behind Fennell); Private Neal Hasted (centre, front), Private Ian Jury (partly obscured, centre, rear, holding rifle); Private Colin Barnett (front, right, M60 ammunition belt on back, back of head to camera), Lance Corporal Stan Whitford (partly obscured behind Barnett), and the helicopter marshal at right is Private John Raymond Gould.

The troops are wearing ‘Patrol Order’ as the operation was a one-day Cordon and Search of Lang Phuoc Hai.

Photographer
The photograph was taken by Sergeant Michael Coleridge, serving in a public relations role with the Australian Army. Coleridge enlisted in 1957 and served in the Royal Australian Artillery in the Malayan Emergency. 

While serving in Malaya Coleridge, using his own equipment, privately made films for the British Army. This work saw the Australian Army assign him a position as a public relations photographer in 1963. Coleridge was posted to Vietnam in 1966. Often exposing himself to danger, Coleridge recorded the tours of 5RAR, 6RAR and 7RAR in Vietnam. Coleridge worked relatively independently and was required to construct his own darkroom and even sometimes purchase his own film. 

Coleridge was born in Slovenia in 1933. Coleridge and his mother moved to Austria at the end of World War II, after the breakdown of his parents' marriage. When he was 16, he migrated to Australia on his own where he worked as a labourer, first in Sydney and later in rural New South Wales. Coleridge, chasing adventure, then moved to the Northern Territory where hs obtained a private pilot licence. Coleridge joined the Australian Army hoping for a role as a pilot. However his lack of formal education saw this path blocked and he was assigned to an artillery unit.

Coleridge discharged himself from the Australian Army on return to Australia in 1967 to support his family in Australia. He worked as a photographer for the Truth, a Melbourne newspaper for a period. He later worked as a cane train driver in Queensland and a gold miner in Western Australia before settling in Canberra where he worked for a while as an attendant at the Australian War Memorial. Later in life he grew walnuts and raised cattle on farms around the Canberra region. He died in 2012 from complications after a fall while suffering from lung cancer.

Cultural impact

Many years after the event, Peter Capp stated that he would "prefer the picture to represent everyone who fought in the Vietnam War, not just the select few in the photo".

Peter Harris remembered the first time he saw the photograph "I was walking through Sydney only matter of months after returning and I saw it in a framed picture in David Jones". He later saw the image used on "everything from biscuit tins to port jugs".

Australia Post included the photograph on a stamp for a series issued in 2016 commemorating Australia's contribution to the Vietnam War.

References

1967 photographs
Australian photographs
Vietnam War photographs
Military history of Australia during the Vietnam War
Collections of the Australian War Memorial